High Standard Derringer was introduced by High Standard Manufacturing Company in 1962; it was a remarkable change to the over-under derringer design with innovative solutions.

The original model (D-100), was produced from 1962 to 1967 in 22 LR only in blued finish. In 1969 the D-101 (.22 LR) and DM-101 (.22 Magnum) upgraded models were released in blued, nickel, silver, and gold plated finishes.

In the 1980s, High Standard Firearms went in financial problems, and ceased derringers production in 1984, Benjamin Johnson Technologies scaled up the design, into a .38 Special pocket gun known as the DA38 Derringer. In 1990 the design went to the American Derringer Company.

See also
 Remington Model 95
 COP .357 Derringer
 DoubleTap derringer
 Pocket pistol
 Remington Zig-Zag Derringer

References

External links
 That Time the Derringer Made a Comeback

Derringers
.22 LR firearms